Dmytro Andriyovych Nyemchaninov (born 27 January 1990) is a Ukrainian professional footballer who plays as a left-back for Mynai.

Career
Nyemchaninov's first professional club was Dynamo Kyiv, but he did not play any matches for the main squad. Next he was close for signing contract with Dnister Ovidiopol in the Ukrainian First League. He made his debut in the Ukrainian Premier League for FC Volyn on 14 July 2013, playing in a match against Dynamo Kyiv. In 2019 he moved to Rukh Lviv. On 29 August 2021 he scored against Desna Chernihiv in Ukrainian Premier League in the season 2021-22 at the Stadion Yuri Gagarin.

International career 
He was called up to the Ukraine national under-21 football team for some matches during 2009, but was not selected for any games.

Honours
Veres Rivne
 Ukrainian First League: 2020-21

References

External links
 
 
 
 Profile at sportnet.sme.sk

Living people
1990 births
Piddubny Olympic College alumni
Footballers from Kyiv
Ukrainian footballers
Ukraine youth international footballers
Association football defenders
FC Dynamo-3 Kyiv players
FC Dynamo-2 Kyiv players
FC Dnister Ovidiopol players
FC Nyva Vinnytsia players
FC Zirka Kropyvnytskyi players
FC Volyn Lutsk players
FC Chornomorets Odesa players
FC Olimpik Donetsk players
PFC Krylia Sovetov Samara players
FC Desna Chernihiv players
FC Rukh Lviv players
FC Nitra players
NK Veres Rivne players
FC Peremoha Dnipro players
MŠK Fomat Martin players
FC Mynai players
Ukrainian Premier League players
Ukrainian First League players
Ukrainian Second League players
Russian First League players
Slovak Super Liga players
3. Liga (Slovakia) players
Ukrainian expatriate footballers
Expatriate footballers in Russia
Ukrainian expatriate sportspeople in Russia
Expatriate footballers in Slovakia
Ukrainian expatriate sportspeople in Slovakia